The 1963–64 season was Chelsea Football Club's fiftieth competitive season.

Table

References

External links
 1963–64 season at stamford-bridge.com

1963–64
English football clubs 1963–64 season